Orni or Ornoi was a town of ancient Thrace mentioned by Hierocles. It was inhabited from Classical through Byzantine times. It may also have borne the name Bornos or Ornos.

Its site is tentatively located south of İnecik in European Turkey.

References

Populated places in ancient Thrace
Former populated places in Turkey
Roman towns and cities in Turkey
Populated places of the Byzantine Empire
History of Tekirdağ Province